High Civilization is the nineteenth studio album by British pop group the Bee Gees, released on 25 March 1991 in the U.K., and 14 May 1991 in the U.S. It was their last album recorded for Warner Bros. Records, after a four-year contract (they would return to WB through subsidiary Reprise Records in 2006: after gaining the rights to their previously released material, they reissued each album through Reprise). Possibly in reaction to firm resistance from U.S. radio to the previous two albums, E.S.P. (1987) and One (1989), which had done well in other countries, the U.S.-based Warner Bros gave this one less promotion and did not issue remixes. They recorded this album and their next album Size Isn't Everything with engineer Femi Jiya.

In the U.S., the album was available only on the CD and cassette, but the LP version was released in limited quantities in some countries. While it did not chart in the U.S., it reached No. 6 in Switzerland, No. 2 in Germany (reaching platinum certification in both countries), No. 24 in the U.K.

Background
The songs as sequenced on the "High Civilization mixes" tell a story of "secret love" that might be all in the singer's head and secret from the girl too. He hesitates one moment and speaks explicitly the next, but is he telling her what he feels. The contradictions give the story a dreamlike effect of details shifting while the singer's feelings remain consistent. The only song that does not fit is the dystopian political title song, unless it expresses the singer's anger and confusion with the world as he feels things are all falling apart. He then casts it all as a romantic tragedy, before finally proposing that maybe even the girl being in love with someone else does not mean the end of it.

High Civilization found a new change for the Bee Gees sound, with heavier use of drum programming and electronic effects, giving a more modern dance feel to the production. Highlights from the album included the first single, "Secret Love", an up-tempo ballad, which was a top five hit in the U.K.; "When He's Gone", a heavier pop song, issued as the album's second single, featuring Alan Kendall's guitar solo ending on that song; and the sentimental ballad "The Only Love", released as the third and final single from the album. The soft ballad "Happy Ever After" was released as a cassette-only single. "True Confessions" was the bonus cut available only on the CD version; it was also issued only in the U.S. as the B-side of "When He's Gone". The album's length was 60 minutes for only eleven songs.

Both High Civilization and Size Isn't Everything were the only post-RSO era albums not to feature concert dates in the U.S., presumably due to health issues with Barry Gibb and lackluster record sales. The band did play three dates in the U.K. and toured Europe.

Despite the album's failure in the U.S., the brothers would work with Femi Jiya again on the follow-up, Size Isn't Everything.

Track listing

Alternate release
"Human Sacrifice"
"When He's Gone"
"Secret Love"
"Ghost Train"
"Evolution"
"Party With No Name"
"True Confessions"
"High Civilization"
"The Only Love"
"Happy Ever After"
"Dimensions"

Personnel
Bee Gees
Barry Gibb – lead and harmony vocals, guitar
Robin Gibb – lead and harmony vocals
Maurice Gibb – backing vocals, keyboards, synthesizer, guitars, lead vocals on "Dimensions"

Additional personnel
Alan Kendall – guitar
Tim Cansfield - guitar
George "Chocolate" Perry – bass guitar
Tim Moore – keyboards, synthesizer, programmer
Mike Murphy - drums
 Trevor Murrell - drums
Scott F. Crago - drums (on "When He's Gone" and "The Only Love") (uncredited)
Lenny Castro – percussion
Julia and Maxine Waters – backing vocals and percussion

Production
Femi Jiya – sound engineer
John Merchant – sound engineer
Barry Gibb, Robin Gibb, Maurice Gibb – producer

Charts and certifications

Weekly charts

Year-end charts

Certifications

References

Bee Gees albums
1991 albums
Warner Records albums
Albums produced by Barry Gibb
Albums produced by Robin Gibb
Albums produced by Maurice Gibb